Menelaus (Menelaos), is one of the two most known Atrides, a king of Sparta and son of Atreus and Aerope.

Menelaus may also refer to:

Astronomy 
 1647 Menelaus, Jovian asteroid
 Menelaus (crater) on the Moon

People and mythology 
 Menelaus of Macedon (various)
 Menelaus (son of Amyntas III)
 Menelaus (son of Lagus), brother of Ptolemy I Soter
 Menelaus of Pelagonia who received Athenian citizenship
 Menelaus (High Priest), 2nd century BC High Priest of the Second Temple
 Menelaus, pupil of Stephanus ( 33 BC) sculptor in the workshop of Pasiteles in the time of Caesar Augustus
 Menelaus of Alexandria, a Hellenistic mathematician and astronomer
 Menelaus's theorem, a theorem attributed to Menelaus of Alexandria

Contemporary
 Jane Menelaus (born 1959), Australian actress